Beijing Municipal No. 2 Prison()  is a prison in the municipality of Beijing, China. Operated by the Beijing Municipal Administration of Prisons, it was established in 1950.

See also
List of prisons in Beijing municipality

References
 Kiely, Jan. The Compelling Ideal: Thought Reform and the Prison in China, 1901-1956. Yale University Press, May 27, 2014. , 9780300185942.

Notes

External links
Beijing Municipal No. 2 Prison  (Archive)
Laogai Research Foundation Handbook

Prisons in Beijing
1950 establishments in China